Ochromima pallipes is a species of beetle in the family Cerambycidae. It was described by Olivier in 1795. It is known from French Guiana and Suriname. There are no catalogued subspecies

References

Hemilophini
Beetles described in 1795